Mokriyan may refer to:
Mokriyan-e Gharbi Rural District
Mokriyan-e Sharqi Rural District
Mokriyan-e Shomali Rural District